One Tree Island is a small coral cay. It is located near the Tropic of Capricorn in the southern Great Barrier Reef, 96 km due east nor east of Gladstone, Queensland, Australia, and 450 km north of the state capital Brisbane.  The island is part of the Great Barrier Reef chain of islands, and is part of the Capricorn and Bunker Group of island and forms part of the Capricornia Cays National Park.  It is also part of the Capricornia Cays Important Bird Area.

General 
One Tree Island is a rubble or shingle cay at the eastern end of a coral reef which is about 5.5 km by 3.5 km in size

Vegetation consists of scattered velvet soldierbush and Scaevola taccada with several small groves of Pisonia grandis. A small pond of brackish water is situated near the centre of tile cay. A research station conducted by Sydney University is located on the cay.

Geomorphology and landscape
The Capricorn and Bunker Cays form part of a distinct geomorphic province at the southern end of the Great Barrier Reef. The cays and their reefs lie on the western marginal shelf, and are separated from the mainland by the Curtis Channel. The cays are not generally visible from the mainland, although Masthead Island may be viewed from Mount Larcom on a clear day.

Geologically the cays are young, having developed during the Holocene period, they are mostly around 5000 years old. The sea level was much lower during the last ice age (at the end of the Pleistocene period) and the coastal plain on which today's reefs and cays developed was completely exposed. Early in the Holocene (around 10,000 years ago) the sea level began to rise, until it stabilised at its present level around 6000 years ago. Once the sea level stabilised, it was possible for reef flats to expand and provide potential sites for the formation of cays.

One Tree Island is a Shingle cay and part of a Lagoonal Platform Reef:

History

Discovery
In 1803 Captain Eber Bunker of the whaling ship Albion was the first European to discover the region and gave his name to the southern group.

During a second whaling voyage from England in the Albion he discovered the Bunker Islands off the Queensland coast.

The Albion was 362 tons and registered in London, the ship was fitted with 10 guns, and a crew of 26; she was built in Deptfordand, Britain ownered by, Messrs. Champion; and used for general cargo

The southern cays and reefs were first chartered between 1819 and 1821 by Lieutenant Phillip Parker King RN initially in the Mermaid and later in the Bathurst. The main charting exercise for all the islands and reefs was carried out in 1843 under the command of Captain Francis Blackwood in HMS Fly which was accompanied by the Bramble. The naturalist, Professor J. Beete Jukes, was on board the Fly and his published journal provides valuable information on some of the cays.

Current uses
The island and reef are zoned for scientific research in a Zoning Plan under the Great Barrier Reef Marine Park Act, 1975

Research station
The Australian Museum began research at One Tree Island in 1965 and it has been managed by the University of Sydney since 1974. The site is renowned for Great Barrier Reef research with a bibliography of 400+ titles. Research at the station has focused on climate change and bleaching, eutrophication of reef systems, carbonate chemistry, geology, sedimentation, and the ecology of reef organisms.

The research station provides accommodation for both research and education groups for up to 31 people. There are 2 accommodation blocks, Eagle View and Lagoon View, named due to their unique scenic views. Each has shared kitchen facilities and bunkbeds for sleeping. There is also a scenic BBQ area by the water edge. The stations fresh water supply comes solely from rainwater, therefore bucket showers are used to reduce water wastage. The station has composting toilets and is run off solar power with a backup diesel generator. There is excellent wi-fi connection throughout the facilities which is included in bench fees.

The station has 3 laboratory spaces including a wet laboratory with indoors aquaria airconditioned areas, semi-outdoor and fully outdoor spaces. The seawater comes from a flow through system that is pumped from the adjacent lagoon. The biological laboratory is an airconditioned space with fume hood and basic laboratory supplies. There is also a dry laboratory/teaching space with microscopes, small library, whiteboard and projector.

There are a range of vessels available for use whilst on the station including smaller aluminum punts and larger research vessels. The station has a compressor for filling SCUBA tanks and they hire out snorkeling gear.

Ecology

Natural
Green turtle rookeries are located at Wreck Island, West Fairfax and West Hoskyn Islands; these are maintained in a natural condition, free from human disturbance.  Up to eight seabird species breed on Masthead, One Tree and Wreck Islands, and seven species are recorded from Tryon, Erskine and West Fairfax Islands. The Capricorn silvereye, a small bird endemic to the southern Great Barrier Reef, is found on the island.  There are also brown booby breeding colonies at East and West Fairfax and East Hoskyn Islands.

The shallow-water rhodolith beds in One Tree Reef extend in the intertidal to shallow subtidal zones of the coralgal rim at the leeward side of the reef. In these rhodoliths rare to common ichnogenus Gastrochaenolites is produced by the boring bivalve Gastrochaena cf. turbinatus (Bassi et al., 2020).

Known shipwrecks on the reef 
Wisteria Sunk 14 September 1887 Barque built as the Look At Home; not salvaged One Tree Island /Wistari Reef? With a cargo of flour, bran, chaff and cement, she broke up on One Tree Island. An inquiry found that her loss was caused by the incompetence of her master and mate. The master's certificate was cancelled.

Jane Lockhart sunk between the 11  through to 17 December 1868 on Lady Musgrave Island / Heron Island / Masthead Reef or One Tree Island. The vessel was a 2 Mast Schooner . Departed from Sydney with general cargo for Broadsound; and ran aground on Lady Musgrave Island; maybe on Heron Island or One Tree Island or Masthead Reef  Lost on a reef off Heron Island on the night of 17 December 1868. The crew took to the boat and safely reached the Pilot station at Keppel Island.
Originally stated as on Lady Musgrave reef (most unlikely) later news reports claim wreck on Heron Island with some other reports mention the wreck on either One Tree Island or Mast Head.
The vessel was built in 1861 at Ulladulla New South Wales and registered in Sydney with the Official number of 36858 and a Registered number of 9/1861

From the original reports
One of the boats dispatched to the wreck of the Jane Lockhart, schooner, has returned with the sails and a portion of the running and standing gear. The vessel, it appears, did not strike on Bunker's Group, as reported by Captain Machen, but upon what is known as Heron Island, about ninety miles to the northward of Bunker's Group. When the boat reached the vessel she was settled in a hollow in one of the reefs, the outer formation of the hollow acting as a breakwater against the seas. One side of the vessel was quite visible, and the new copper sheathing appeared uninjured. Captain Norris, who went down in charge of the boat, unbent the sails, so that the position of the vessel might as much as possible remain unaltered; he left the yards and masts standing.

and 6 months later it was reported as
The Rose, schooner, has returned from the wreck of the Jane Lockhart, on Masthead Reef, whither she went on June 15 Captain Dwyer informs us that the Jane Lockhart still lies in a very snug position, and he has no doubt but that himself, and Mr Norris, the purchaser of the wreck, will be able, ultimately, to raise the vessel and bring her safely to Rockhampton

Nearly the whole of the period that they were at the reef, very heavy weather prevailed, staving operations towards the recovery of the cargo, but luckily the strong SE winds lulled for about three days Captain Dwyer availed himself of the occasion, set to work, rigged up a staging between the masts of the Lockhart, schooner, and by means of a rope and a South Sea Island diver, managed to bring up from eighty to ninety large iron pulley wheels, besides a quantity of machinery and sundries, comprising Ale, porter, liqueur brandy, cutlery, ironmongery, etc. Unfortunately the Rose's water ran out, much to the chagrin of the crew, who would have raised a great deal more, only having to run into port for supplies

See also
 Capricorn and Bunker Group
 Great Barrier Reef
 Capricornia Cays National Park

References

Australian shipwrecks Vol. 1 1622–1850 by Charles Bateson. Sydney. Reed, 1972 910.4530994 BAT
Australian shipwrecks Vol. 2 1851–1871 by Loney, J. K. (Jack Kenneth), 1925–1995. Sydney. Reed, 1980 910.4530994 LON
Australian shipwrecks Vol. 3 1871–1900 by Loney, J. K. (Jack Kenneth), 1925–1995. Geelong Vic: List Publishing, 1982 910.4530994 LON
Australian shipwrecks Vol. 4 1901–1986 by Loney, J. K. (Jack Kenneth), 1925–1995. Portarlington Vic. Marine History Publications, 1987 910.4530994 LON
Australian shipwrecks Vol. 5 Update 1986 by Loney, J. K. (Jack Kenneth), 1925–1995. Portarlington Vic. Marine History Publications, 1991 910.4530994 LON
 

Great Barrier Reef
Islands on the Great Barrier Reef
Important Bird Areas of Queensland